Giacomo Mazzucato  (born 10 January 1994), known by his stage name Yakamoto Kotzuga, is an Italian musician, composer and record producer.

Biography 
The eclectic young artist studied at the Conservatorium of Venice.

He began his career in 2013 with:
 The EP, “Rooms of Emptiness” published by Bad Panda Records
 The EP, “Lost Keys & Stolen Kisses” for the French of Highlife Recordings 
He worked on a few musical productions for the rappers Ghemon and Mecna,  with various remixes and collaborations, such as “Your Smell” chosen as the soundtrack for Vogue's news report at Paris Fashion Week.

In 2014 he published the single All These Things I Used To Have.

In 2014 he also won an artistic residence in Fabrica, at the communication research centre for the Benetton Group, where he worked as a composer and sound designer, creating soundtracks for documentaries, installations and commercial spots for the brand.

In 2015: 
 He signed a contract for exclusive publishing with Sugar, one of the most important independent publishers in Europe, which gives the young musician and producer access to his own Italian  and international network.
 He published his debut album "Usually Nowhere" for La Tempesta International/Sugar, which gave him the chance to share the stage with artists, such as Forest Swords, Tycho, Plaid, Lone, Jhon Talabot, Legowelt and many others
 He published the single "Futile", which became the soundtrack to the first Italian experiment of videoclips created entirely with the technology of usable virtual reality at 360° and produced by Cattleya.
 He worked with well known figures in the fashion industry, such as Chiara Boni, for whom he created -in October 2015– the official set for the New York Fashion Week show.
In 2016 he published his single "T.H.R.U."

Currently he is working on a new project, which should be completed by the end of 2017.

Yakamoto's music is a mix between very different sounds and styles that may resemble to various artists throughout the world (e.g. The Chromatics) and can vary from hip hop to classic music, so this is the reason why he continuously searches for collaboration with international artists.

References 

Italian record producers
Italian composers